Post Office Scandal may refer to:
The Congressional Post Office scandal in the US, investigated 1991–95
The British Post Office scandal, which began in the mid-1990s